This is a list of notable individuals born in Egypt of Lebanese ancestry or people of Lebanese and Egyptian dual nationality who live or lived in Egypt.

Film, television and radio personalities
Youseff Chahine, film director
Henry Barakat, film director
Assia Dagher, actress and producer
Nour el Houda- actress
Mary Queeny, actress and producer
Georges Schehadé, playwright and poet
 Omar Sharif, actor
Hana Shiha, actress
Badia Masabni- actress and dancer
Rose Al Yusuf- actress and journalist

Writers and journalists 

George Antonius- author and historian
Farah Antun- journalist and secularist
Alexandra Avierino, journalist and writer
Celine Axelos, poet
Andrée Chedid, poet
Zaynab Fawwaz- novelist and playwright
Labiba Hashim- novelist and founder of Fatat al-sharq
Khalil Mutran- poet and journalist
Hind Nawfal, journalist and feminist writer
Ihsan Abdel Quddous- novelist
Edward Zaid, writer
Jurji Zaydan- novelist, founder of Al-Hilal
May Ziadeh, writer

Media
 Beshara Takla, co-founder of Al-Ahram
 Saleem Takla, co-founder of Al-Ahram

Music and Arts 

Farid al-Atrash, singer, composer and musician
Bob Azzam, singer
Édika, comics artist
Manuel Tadros- singer and actor

Architects 

Charles Ayrout
 Naoum Shebib, architect, designer of the Cairo Tower

Activists
Aya Hijazi, American social activist.

Athletes
 Jamal Taha, association football player and coach
 Alain Attalah, basketball player and coach

See also
List of Lebanese people
List of Lebanese diaspora
Lebanese people in Egypt

References

People of Lebanese descent 
 
Lebanese